Luna Nørgaard Gevitz (born 3 March 1994), sometimes written Gewitz, is a Danish footballer who plays as a defender for Montpellier and the Danish national team.

Club career
After beginning her senior career with IK Skovbakken, Gevitz spent the 2012–13 season in France with Montpellier HSC. She signed for Fortuna Hjørring in August 2013, but an ankle injury delayed her debut for her new club until March 2014. In 2019, Gevitz signed for French Division 1 Féminine club Guingamp. She made 14 appearances for them in the 2020–21 Division 1 Féminine season. In February 2021, Gevitz signed for Swedish club BK Häcken.

International career
Gevitz played for Denmark under-19s at the 2012 UEFA Under-19 European Championship. Gevitz made her debut for the senior Denmark national  team in June 2014, a 5–0 win over Israel in qualifying for the 2015 FIFA World Cup. She was a member of the Danish squad at the 2017 UEFA European Championship.

References

External links 

 
 Profile at Danish Football Association 
 Profile at Foot o féminin 
 
 

1994 births
Living people
Sportspeople from Aarhus
Danish women's footballers
Women's association football defenders
Montpellier HSC (women) players
Fortuna Hjørring players
En Avant Guingamp (women) players
Division 1 Féminine players
Denmark women's international footballers
Danish expatriate women's footballers
Danish expatriate sportspeople in France
Expatriate women's footballers in France
UEFA Women's Euro 2022 players
UEFA Women's Euro 2017 players
Association football defenders
Denmark youth international footballers
Denmark international footballers